Bizarre is the tenth and final  album by the Los Angeles, California-based R&B group the Sylvers. Released in 1984, the album was primarily produced by Leon Sylvers III along with Foster Sylvers and James Sylvers. This was their only album for Geffen Records.

Track listing
"Tension" (Joey Gallo, Leon F. Sylvers III, Pamela Phillips Oland)
"The Bottom Line" (Leon F. Sylvers III, William Zimmerman, Wilmer Raglin)
"Falling for Your Love" (Foster Sylvers, Pamela Phillips Oland)
"Boomerang" (Kevin Walker, Pamela Phillips Oland)
"Bizarre" (James Sylvers) produced by James Sylvers)
"In One Love and Out the Other"  (Dana Meyers, Leon F. Sylvers III, Pamela Phillips Oland)
"Got to Be Crazy" (Dana Meyers, Foster Sylvers) produced  by Foster Sylvers
"Your Turn Me On" (Foster Sylvers, Pamela Phillips Oland)  produced  by Foster Sylvers
"(Open Up Your Heart And) Let My Love Shine In" (Leon F. Sylvers III, Pamela Phillips Oland)
"Something's Gotta Give" (Foster Sylvers, Joey Gallo, Leon F. Sylvers III, Pamela Phillips Oland)

References

External links
 Bizarre at Discogs

1984 albums
The Sylvers albums
Geffen Records albums
Albums produced by Leon Sylvers III